Demob was a short-lived British comedy-drama television series, which screened for one six-episode series in 1993; It was produced by Talkback Productions in association with Yorkshire Television for ITV.

The series was set in the late 1940s and early 1950s, and starred Martin Clunes and Griff Rhys Jones as two ex-army friends who decide to try to form an entertainment act, with the aim of getting work on BBC radio. The series also starred Samantha Janus, Amanda Redman and Les Dawson, Dawson posthumously.

Plot
The series follows the ups and downs of two World War II veterans who decide to form a comedy duo after returning home to England. They experience various personal and professional problems as they strive for success.

Characters

Lead characters
Ian Deasey (Griff Rhys Jones): A cheerful ex-soldier who struggles to adjust to his dull pre-war life and decides to become a comedy team with his army pal, Dick Dobson. Ian is known for singing humorous songs.
Dick Dobson (Martin Clunes): An irresponsible ex-soldier who always gets into scrapes and has to be rescued by Ian. He is an excellent piano player and forms one half of the comedy duo Dobson and Deasey.
Janet Deasey (Amanda Redman): Ian's beautiful wife who grows dissatisfied with her husband's desire to become a comedian and begins an affair to stave off boredom.
Hedda Kennedy (Samantha Janus): A beautiful dancer, who is desperately searching for her American husband, believed to be missing in action. She works in various establishments of Rudy Lorimer's as a singer and dancer. She later becomes a film actress. She is good friends with Ian and Dick and lives next door to their London rooms.
Moreton Stanley (Les Dawson): A corpulent short-tempered comic who makes improper advances to Hedda.
Rudy Lorimer (James Faulkner): A disreputable businessman who continually ensnares Dick in his shady business ventures. Lorimer is an alias; his real name is not known.

Supporting characters
Alan Deasey (Luke Marcel): Ian and Janet's only child, he is a perceptive, sensitive boy vulnerable to teasing. When his father returns from the war he hardly recognises him.
Annabel (Tilly Blackwood): Janet's best friend, Annabel is engaged to be married to Dr. Pollock.
Edith (Liz Fraser): Janet's mother who dispenses advice freely.
Dr. Jeremy Pollock (Harry Burton): Annabel's fiancé who develops an interest in Janet. He has a fondness for Gilbert and Sullivan musicals.
Oliver Lee (Don Gilet): Hedda's American GI friend who assists her in her search for her missing husband. Oliver plays the saxophone at a London jazz club.
Frank Parsons: (Tony Melody) Ian's boss at the council.
Ottie Pond (Roberta Taylor): The producer of "Radio Playtime", a BBC Radio children's programme.
Keith Koster (Jeremy Child): The notoriously difficult ventriloquist star of "Radio Playtime", Koster seems to believe that his dummy is actually sentient.
Claudette (Colleen Passard): Dick's wife who he marries only to help her gain entry into the UK. Originally from France, she is a prostitute who works for Rudy Lorimer.
Moira Stanley (Pat Keen): Moreton Stanley's wife who also serves as his manager.
Mrs. O'Callagan (Barbara Ashcroft): The duo's Liverpool landlady who takes a shine to Dick much to his horror.
Morton Stanley (Les Dawson)
June (Cinnamon Bone)
Inspector Wareham (Richard Cubison)
Camera (John Clegg)
Ralph (Richard Lintern)
Roy (Timothy Knightley)
Walter (Peter J. Morton)

Episode list

Home media
Demob was first released on DVD by BFS Entertainment on 10 September 2002. It was re-released by Acorn Media on Region 1 and Region 4 DVD on 26 April 2011.

References

External links

Television series by Yorkshire Television
British comedy-drama television shows
1993 British television series debuts
1993 British television series endings
1990s British comedy-drama television series
Television series set in the 1950s
Television series set in the 1940s
ITV television dramas
Television series by ITV Studios
Television series by Fremantle (company)
Television shows set in London
1990s British television miniseries
English-language television shows